The Sahā Triad (娑婆三聖, pinyin: suōpó sānshèng) is a devotional motif in East Asian Buddhist art.  It represents the chief Buddha and bodhisattvas of the Sahā World:

 Śākyamuni
 Avalokiteśvara
 Kṣitigarbha

Summary
The Sahā Triad is a relatively recent development in Buddhist art and is particularly popular in Taiwan. Although largely affiliated with the Tzu Chi Foundation, it has spread among the broader circle of Chinese Buddhism.

Chapter 12 of the Kṣitigarbha Sūtra provides an episode in which all these of these figures are present:

References

Buddha statues
Buddhist iconography